Alain Baroja Méndez (born 23 October 1989) is a Venezuelan footballer who plays for Caracas FC as a goalkeeper.

Club career
Born in Caracas, Alain debuted for the national team at age 25. Initially second-choice to Dani Hernandez, he soon worked his way up to first-choice and eventually earned his first senior cap following some brilliant performances at club level with Caracas FC.

On 17 July 2015, AEK Athens reached an agreement with Caracas FC for the transfer of Alain Baroja on a one-year loan. The 25-year-old Venezuelan goalkeeper was under AEK Athens radar for a while and as his team, Caracas FC, officially announced his transfer -on a one-year loan- to the Greek club was completed. He started as the indisputable first goalie of the club, till 17 December 2015 when he suffered a finger injury in training and will remain out of action for at least one month.
On 13 February 2016, almost two months from his last appearance, he replaced his teammate Giannis Anestis, being the first choice of AEK manager Gustavo Poyet, in a glorious 1-0 derby win against the undefeated, till that game, champions Olympiakos.
On 9 June 2016, the officials of AEK Athens announced that they are not intended to activate the buying clause on Alain Baroja's loan contract and the Venezuelan goalkeeper will return to Caracas FC.

On 24 August 2016, Baroja was loaned to Spanish Segunda División club Cádiz CF, being immediately loaned out to Sud América in Uruguay.

International career
On 1 October 2012, Baroja received his first call-up to the Venezuelan senior side, for a match scheduled to be played against Ecuador on 16 October 2012 for the 2014 FIFA World Cup qualification, but he didn't play. He was called again to play a friendly match against Nigeria but he didn't play either.

Under the new management of Noel Sanvicente, Dani Hernandez was used as first choice goalkeeper in the first 4 friendly games of Sanvicente. In February 2015, there were scheduled 2 matches against Honduras, but because they were out of the FIFA calendar, Sanvicente could only call players from the Venezuelan Primera División for the national team. Baroja was chosen as the starting goalkeeper and finally debuted for the national team at age 25. Venezuela won both matches against Honduras and Baroja's performance was very well received. Baroja started again against Peru on March, a game Venezuela won 1–0 with another good performance of the goalkeeper.
On 10 November 2015, Baroja is doubtful for the games with his national team, but his injury isn't serious enough to worry AEK. Baroja played for a couple of minutes at the end of the game against Asteras Tripolis suffering two-headed muscle injury. The footballer travelled to Venezuela and according to the National team's medical staff his injury isn't too severe.

2015 Copa America
On 12 May 2015, Baroja was named in Venezuela's 23-man squad for the Copa America 2015 and assigned the number 1 shirt. Initially second-choice to Dani Hernandez, he soon worked his way up to first-choice following some brilliant performances at club level with Caracas FC and earned his first cap in a competitive match. In the team's opening match of the tournament against Colombia, he kept a clean sheet and stopped a shot from James Rodríguez helping the team's victory.  Baroja started the next 2 group games of Venezuela and made a world-class save in the last group match, stopping a header from Brazil's centre-back Thiago Silva. Despite his good performance in the tournament Venezuela was eliminated in the group stage.

Career statistics

Club

International

Honours

Clubs
 Caracas
 Copa Venezuela: 2013

 AEK Athens
 Greek Cup: 2015-2016

References 

1989 births
Living people
Footballers from Caracas
Association football goalkeepers
Venezuelan footballers
Venezuelan expatriate footballers
Venezuela international footballers
2015 Copa América players
Venezuelan Primera División players
Ecuadorian Serie A players
Uruguayan Primera División players
Super League Greece players
Caracas FC players
Llaneros de Guanare players
AEK Athens F.C. players
Cádiz CF players
Sud América players
Monagas S.C. players
Carabobo F.C. players
Delfín S.C. footballers
Expatriate footballers in Greece
Expatriate footballers in Uruguay
Expatriate footballers in Ecuador
Venezuelan expatriate sportspeople in Greece
Venezuelan expatriate sportspeople in Uruguay
Venezuelan expatriate sportspeople in Ecuador